Caladenia prolata, commonly known as long-leaf fingers or white fingers is a plant in the orchid family Orchidaceae and is endemic to southern Australia. It is a ground orchid with a single leaf and one or two dull white flowers which are greenish with red stripes on the back.

Description
Caladenia prolata is a terrestrial, perennial, deciduous, herb with an underground tuber and which usually grows as single plants. The sides of the labellum have four to six short teeth near the tip as it curls under. There are two rows of white or yellow calli along the mid-line of the labellum. Flowering occurs in October and November.

Taxonomy and naming
Caladenia prolata was first formally described in 1991 by David Jones and the description was published in Australian Orchid Research. The specific epithet (prolata) is a Latin word meaning "extended" or "elongated" in reference to the ovary which in this species is longer than in similar species, such as C.vulgaris.

Distribution and habitat
Caladenia prolata has been recorded from scattered locations in Victoria, south-eastern South Australia and from Flinders Island and Deal Island in Tasmania. It grows in coastal scrub, heathy forest and sometimes on granite outcrops.

References

prolata
Plants described in 1991
Endemic orchids of Australia
Orchids of Victoria (Australia)
Taxa named by David L. Jones (botanist)